Giancarlo Carloni (born June 8, 1947 in Civita Castellana) is a retired Italian professional football player.

His professional debut in the 1966/67 season for A.S. Roma remained his only Serie A game in his career.

1947 births
Living people
Italian footballers
Serie A players
A.S. Roma players
Ascoli Calcio 1898 F.C. players
Giulianova Calcio players
Frosinone Calcio players
F.C. Grosseto S.S.D. players
A.C.R. Messina players
Association football defenders